In Greek mythology, Elephenor  ( Elephḗnōr, -oros) was the king of the Abantes of Euboea.

Family 
Elephenor was the son of Chalcodon by either Imenarete, Melanippe or Alcyone.

Mythology 
Elephenor received the sons of Theseus of Athens, Acamas and Demophon, when they fled from the usurper Menestheus. One source states that he unwittingly killed his grandfather Abas and was expelled from Euboea; because of that, he had to assemble his troops before the Trojan expedition on a rock of the Euripus Strait opposite Euboea.

Trojan War 
Elephenor was a suitor of Helen and the leader of the Euboean force of thirty or forty ships which joined the Greek expedition to Troy. On the day the truce was broken by Pandarus, he was killed by Agenor whilst trying to drag off the body of Echepolus.

The Return 
On their way home, Elephonor's men were driven off course and shipwrecked off the coast of Epirus, where they founded the city of Apollonia. Alternately, Elephenor survived and settled on the island Othronos, but was soon driven out of the island by a serpent and went to Abantia in Illyria.

Notes

References 

 Apollodorus, The Library with an English Translation by Sir James George Frazer, F.B.A., F.R.S. in 2 Volumes, Cambridge, MA, Harvard University Press; London, William Heinemann Ltd. 1921. ISBN 0-674-99135-4. Online version at the Perseus Digital Library. Greek text available from the same website.
 Gaius Julius Hyginus, Fabulae from The Myths of Hyginus translated and edited by Mary Grant. University of Kansas Publications in Humanistic Studies. Online version at the Topos Text Project.
 Homer, The Iliad with an English Translation by A.T. Murray, Ph.D. in two volumes. Cambridge, MA., Harvard University Press; London, William Heinemann, Ltd. 1924. . Online version at the Perseus Digital Library.
 Homer, Homeri Opera in five volumes. Oxford, Oxford University Press. 1920. . Greek text available at the Perseus Digital Library.
 Lucius Mestrius Plutarchus, Lives with an English Translation by Bernadotte Perrin. Cambridge, MA. Harvard University Press. London. William Heinemann Ltd. 1914. 1. Online version at the Perseus Digital Library. Greek text available from the same website.
 Pausanias, Description of Greece with an English Translation by W.H.S. Jones, Litt.D., and H.A. Ormerod, M.A., in 4 Volumes. Cambridge, MA, Harvard University Press; London, William Heinemann Ltd. 1918. . Online version at the Perseus Digital Library
 Pausanias, Graeciae Descriptio. 3 vols. Leipzig, Teubner. 1903.  Greek text available at the Perseus Digital Library.

Achaean Leaders

Princes in Greek mythology
Kings in Greek mythology
Euboean characters in Greek mythology